The International Building Exhibition Berlin (IBA Berlin) was an urban renewal project in West Berlin, Germany. Initiated in 1979, it was completed in 1987, matching the 750th anniversary of the founding of Berlin. The IBA followed two distinct strategies: "careful urban renewal" and "critical reconstruction." With a budget of $1.2 billion, it was to house about 30,000 people in selected areas of West Berlin.

History
IBA was divided into two programs, each responsible for about 6,000 apartments. In 1979 Josef Paul Kleihues was appointed director of the IBA Neubau section by the Berlin Senate; Hardt Waltherr Hämer was director of the less-publicised Altbau He organised the exhibition along two distinct themes: IBA Alt aimed to explore methods of "careful urban renewal" and IBA Neu for experimenting "critical reconstruction." 

Kleihues invited many international architects from 10 countries – including Gottfried Böhm, Mario Botta, Peter Eisenman, Vittorio Gregotti, John Hejduk, Herman Hertzberger, Hans Hollein, Arata Isozaki, Léon Krier, Rob Krier, Charles Moore, Aldo Rossi and James Stirling – to build in the following areas: the Prager Platz in Wilmersdorf as well as the Tegel, southern Tiergarten and southern Friedrichstadt districts. Consequently, Time called the IBA "the most ambitious showcase of world architecture in this generation".

Gallery

See also
Interbau – an International Building Exhibition organised in Berlin in 1957

References

Further reading
Kleihues, Josef Paul; Klotz, Heinrich: International Building Exhibition Berlin 1987: examples of new architecture, Rizzoli, 1986

External links

Housing in Germany
Buildings and structures in Berlin
1980s in West Berlin